Doun Kaev (lit. "Crystal Grandmother") is the capital of Takéo Province, Cambodia. In 1998 it had a population of 39,186. The town and province is known for silk weaving, and the province is home to about 10,000 of the total of 15,000 Cambodian weavers. Most silk weavers in the villages are near the national highway in the direction of Takéo town. The technique of silk weaving could have come to the Khmer during the Kingdom of Funan, probably in the 2nd century, from India and China.

Notable people
Pen Sovan (1936–2016), former Prime Minister of Cambodia  
Chinary Ung (born 1942), composer

References

 

Populated places in Takéo province
Provincial capitals in Cambodia
Cities in Cambodia